"Good Evening, Caroline" is a 1908 popular song, written by Albert Von Tilzer and Jack Norworth. The singer Billy Murray made at least two recordings of the song:  one from 1908 on Edison Records, and one in 1909 on Indestructible Record Company. The 1909 recording  became one of the most popular recordings of its year. Murray's versions are the most commonly heard today.

Another version of the song was recorded in 1908 by Frank C. Stanley and Elise Stevenson (Victor 5627 and Columbia A5080).

External links
 Website with public domain version of the song

Stanley/Stevenson version: 
 http://www.78discography.com/vic5000.htm (10-in single-faced 78rpm record)
 http://www.78discography.com/COLA5000.htm (12-in double-faced 78rpm record)
 http://adp.library.ucsb.edu/index.php/matrix/index

1908 songs
Billy Murray (singer) songs
Pop standards
Vaudeville songs
Songs written by Albert Von Tilzer
Songs written by Jack Norworth